St Mary the Virgin Church is a small parish church in the town of Corringham, Essex, England. Saxon in origin, it is a Grade I listed building.

Saxon origin 
St Cedd left Lindisfarne in Northumberland in England, and travelled down to Bradwell-on-Sea in Essex, establishing St Peter's Chapel, and afterwards established a monastery at Tilbury in 653 AD, and then a small wooden church where St Mary's stands now. The wooden structure being constructed of split logs, it would have been similar to that of the surviving Greensted Church in Essex. After 150 years the church came under attack from Vikings in the 9th century. The last ownership of Corringham and the church by the Saxons was in 1066. Sigar, a Saxon freeman, held the parish in the time of Edward the Confessor, King of England. In the Domesday Book of 1086 its states that Sigar held one manor, four hides and ten acres.

Viking attack 
In the 9th century St Mary the Virgin Church, came under attack from the Viking raiding parties; when they arrived at St Cedd's monastery at Tilbury, they burnt it to the ground. These raiding parties continued onto Corringham and other vulnerable villages.

St Mary the Virgin Church in this time would take the entire village population inside its wooden walls for protection. After repeated attacks a wall was built around the wooden structure, out of ragstone rubble and flint. This can still be seen today in parts of the south wall. Herringbone stonework is visible to this day.

Normans and Bishop Odo 

Corringham, along with its church, came under the jurisdiction and ownership of the bishop of London, and Bishop Odo of Bayeux of France. The Normans quickly undertook a building programme to reinforce churches such as St Mary the Virgin; between 1080 and 1120, the West Tower was constructed joining onto the nave. In 1100 the nave walls were heightened, and existing Saxon windows replaced with Norman ones.

The Baud family 
The Baud family originally came from Germany, and arrived in England around the time of the Norman Conquest of 1066. The family were supporters of William the Conqueror and were mentioned as owning several manors, first being mentioned in 1210, a  Philip Baud held land in Corringham, the following years hunting rights were added, and by 1310 the Manor was passed to William De Baud. William De Baud  became involved in the Barons War, a dispute with King Edward II, and as punishment his lands were confiscated and William was imprisoned. When Edward III came to throne, William was released and his lands and manor reinstated; William was so grateful he had the North Chapel constructed.

References

External links
 St Mary the Virgin Church, Corringham

Grade I listed churches in Essex
Churches in Thurrock